Boret or Boreth is a both a given name and a surname. Notable people with the names include:

Long Boret (1933–1975), Cambodian politician
Vadim Boreț (born 1976), Moldovan football player and manager
 Micheal Boret (1713–?), landed in Pennsylvania in 1738.

See also
Bore (surname)
Doret

References